This is a list of political parties in Malaysia, including existing and historical ones.

Legislation
Under the current legislation, all political parties (termed "Political Associations") must be registered under the Societies Act.

Election expenses
The Election Offences Act (1954) regulates the maximum expenses allowed for candidates vying for parliamentary seats and for state seats during the campaign period (excluding before the nomination day and after election day). The permissible campaign expenditure set by the Election Offences Act (1954) is RM100,000 per candidate for state seats and RM200,000 per candidate for federal seats. According to this guideline, with 505 state seats and 222 parliamentary seats in the 2013 general election, the maximum amount that Barisan Nasional was allowed to spend was only about RM95 million. Due to the lack of records and regulations, Malaysian politicians may not even know how much they spent on their campaigns or overspending the expenditure than permitted by law. Another related problem was the secrecy surrounding political funds and their use. Although many politicians, including members of newly appointed cabinets, voluntarily disclosed their personal finances, such disclosure is not compulsory and many sources of revenue remain obscure.

Election deposits
The deposit was RM10,000 to contest a parliamentary seat, or RM5,000 to contest a state assembly seat. The deposit is used to pay for infringements of election laws and is returned after polling day unless the candidate loses and fails to garner more than 12.5 percent or one-eighth of the votes cast. Additionally it is required that each candidate provide a RM5,000 deposit for cleaning up banners and posters after the election.

Political donations
Political donations are legal in Malaysia. There is no limit, and parties are not obliged to disclose the source of the funding, which makes political donations a vague subject but still entirely legal in the country. All political donations are allowed to be given into accounts of individuals and accounts of the political party. Anonymous donors and foreigners may request to not to reveal their identities.

Political parties are funded by contributions from:
 party members and individual supporters (via membership fees/dues/subscriptions and/or local/foreign small donations),
 organisations, which share their political views (e.g. by trade union affiliation fees) or which stand to benefit from their activities (e.g. by local/foreign corporate donations) or
 taxpayers respectively the general revenue fund (by grants that are called state aid, government or public funding).

Latest election results

The parties

Parties represented in the Parliament and/or the state legislative assemblies
This is the list of coalitions and parties that have representation in the Parliament of Malaysia (Dewan Rakyat & Dewan Negara) and/or the state legislative assemblies, sorted by seats held in the Dewan Rakyat, the lower house of the Parliament of Malaysia. Unless noted, numbers exclude independents and loose allies linked to each party

Coalitions and electoral pacts

Pakatan Harapan (PH)

The list is sorted by the year in which the respective parties were legalised and registered with the Registrar of Societies (ROS).

Perikatan Nasional (National Alliance)

The list is sorted by the year in which the respective parties were legalised and registered with the Registrar of Societies (ROS).

Barisan Nasional (National Front)
The list is sorted by the year in which the respective parties were legalised and registered with the Registrar of Societies (ROS).

Gerakan Tanah Air (GTA) 
The list is sorted by the year in which the respective parties were legalised and registered with the Registrar of Societies (ROS).

Gabungan Parti Sarawak (GPS)
The list is sorted by the year in which the respective parties were legalised and registered with the Registrar of Societies (ROS).

Gabungan Rakyat Sabah (GRS) 
The list is sorted by the year in which the respective parties were legalised and registered with the Registrar of Societies (ROS).

Perikatan Rakyat Bersatu Sarawak (PERKASA)
The list is sorted by the year in which the respective parties were legalised and registered with the Registrar of Societies (ROS).

Parties without representation in the Parliament and the state legislative assemblies
This is the list of active coalitions and parties that do not have representation in the Parliament of Malaysia (Dewan Rakyat and Dewan Negara) and the state legislative assemblies, sorted by the year in which the respective parties were legalised and registered with the Registrar of Societies (ROS). Parties that are part of a coalition that is represented are not listed here even if the party itself is not represented.

Parties registered with the ROS and EC 
Political parties registered with the Registrar of Societies (ROS) and with the Election Commission (EC).

Parties registered with the ROS but not with the EC 
Political parties registered with the Registrar of Societies (ROS) but not with the Election Commission (EC). They are therefore unable or able to contest in elections using their own symbols.

Historical parties

These organisations have never been or are no longer registered as political bodies, and can thus no longer contest elections. Parties that were registered in British Malaya but operated solely in the territory of Singapore are also excluded from this list. Parties that have been renamed but still exist today as registered political parties are also excluded from this list. A number of these may still exist as organisations in some form, but none are recognised as political parties.

Before 1949

1950–1959

1960–1969

1970–1979

1980–1989

1990–1999

2000–2009

2010 – present

See also
 Politics of Malaysia
 List of political parties by country
 List of Malaysian electoral districts
 List of the winning political parties in the Malaysian general election by parliamentary constituency

References

External links
 The Registry of Societies Malaysia official website
 Societies Act 1966
 List of political parties registered with Election Commission
 Malaysia elections 1954–2018

Malaysia
Political parties
 
Political parties
Malaysia